Sheikh Ibrahim bin Abdullah bin Abdulaziz bin Abdullah Al Suwaiyel ( Ash-Sheikh Ibrāhīm bin ʿAbdullāh bin ʿAbdulʿazīz bin ʿAbdullāh Al Suwaiyel; 1916 – 22 January 1977) was a Saudi Arabian statesman, diplomat, and military officer who served as the Saudi Arabian minister of foreign affairs from 1960 to 1962. Appointed on 22 December 1960 by King Saud, he succeeded the future king Faisal bin Abdulaziz Al Saud and was succeeded by him again on 16 March 1961. He was noted for being the first non-royal to hold the position of foreign minister. He also served as the Saudi Arabian ambassador to both the United States and Iraq, as the minister of agriculture, and later as a member of the Council of Ministers and an advisor to the Royal Court.

Early life and education
Al Sowayel was born in Unaizah, Al Qassim Province. His father was Sheikh Abdullah bin Abdulaziz Al Sowayel, an imam at a Unaizah mosque. He graduated from Cairo University, and he was the first Najdi person to attend a university.

Career

Early career
Al Sowayel began his career teaching at a mission school in Mecca, before joining the diplomatic corps of the ministry of foreign affairs. He later served as a political advisor to King Saud, and a diplomat at the Saudi embassy in Cairo, Egypt. From 1958 to 1960, before being appointed foreign minister, he was the Ambassador of Saudi Arabia to Iraq.

Minister of Foreign Affairs
Al Suwaiyel was appointed minister of foreign affairs by King Saud, and took office on 22 December 1960. His predecessor was Faisal bin Abdulaziz Al Saud (later King Faisal), who was a close friend of Al Suwaiyel. With Faisal having been responsible for the Saudi domains' foreign policy since 1930 (two years before the proclamation of the Kingdom of Saudi Arabia), Al Suwaiyel became the country's second foreign minister, and the first minister who was not a member of the Saudi royal family. Al Suwaiyel held the office of foreign minister briefly, for less than two years, before returning it back to Faisal, whom he had asked to succeed him. He left office on 16 March 1962.

Later career

On 31 October 1962, Al Suwaiyel took office as the minister of agriculture, serving until 29 August 1964. When Faisal became the king, Al Suwaiyel was appointed ambassador to the United States, serving until King Faisal's assassination in 1975. In June 1974 during an informal conversation between US Foreign Minister Henry Kissinger and senior Saudi officials, including Crown Prince Khalid, Prince Fahd, Prince Sultan and Prince Musaid Kissinger stated that Al Suwaiyel was very devoted to Saudi Arabia.

Following the reign of King Khalid Al Suwaiyel left his ambassadorship and returned to Riyadh to help aide the new monarch. From 1975 until his death in 1977, he served as an advisor to the Saudi Royal Court and as a member of the Council of Ministers.

Death
Al Suwaiyel died of complications from emphysema at dawn on 21 May 1977 in Riyadh.

References

20th-century diplomats
20th-century Saudi Arabian politicians
1916 births
1977 deaths
Advisors
Agriculture ministers
Ambassadors of Saudi Arabia to Iraq
Ambassadors of Saudi Arabia to the United States
Cairo University alumni
Foreign ministers of Saudi Arabia
Government ministers of Saudi Arabia
Major generals
People from Unaizah
Saudi Arabian educators
Saudi Arabian Muslims